The Indonesian language has absorbed many loanwords from other languages, Sanskrit, Chinese, Japanese, Arabic, Hebrew, Persian, Portuguese, Dutch, English, and  other Austronesian languages.

Indonesian differs from the form of Malay used in Brunei, Malaysia and Singapore in a number of aspects, primarily due to the different influences both languages experienced and also due to the fact that the majority of Indonesians speak another language as their mother tongue. Indonesian functions as the lingua franca for speakers of 700 various languages across the archipelago.

Conversely, many words of Malay-Indonesian origin have also been borrowed into English. Words borrowed into English (e.g., bamboo, orangutan, dugong, amok, and even "cooties") generally entered through Malay language by way of British colonial presence in Malaysia and Singapore, similar to the way the Dutch have been borrowing words from the various native Indonesian languages. One exception is "bantam", derived from the name of the Indonesian province Banten in Western Java (see Oxford American Dictionary, 2005 edition). Another is "lahar" which is Javanese for a volcanic mudflow. Still other words taken into modern English from Malay/Indonesian probably have other origins (e.g., "satay" from Tamil, or "ketchup" from Chinese).

During development, various native terms (mostly Javanese) from all over the archipelago made their way into the language. The Dutch adaptation of the Malay language during the colonial period resulted in the incorporation of a significant number of Dutch loanwords and vocabulary. This event significantly affected the original Malay language, which gradually developed into modern Indonesian. Most terms are documented in Kamus Besar Bahasa Indonesia.

Chronology 
The study of Indonesian etymology and loan words reflects its historical and social context. Examples include the early Sanskrit borrowings, probably during the Srivijaya period, the borrowings from Arabic and Persian, especially during the time of the establishment of Islam, and words borrowed from Dutch during the colonial period. Linguistic history and cultural history are clearly linked.

 Early Hindu and Buddhist influence from India results in many Sanskrit words in Indonesian (and especially adopted through Javanese influence). Indian traders may have contributed words as well, in Tamil and Sanskrit-related languages.
 Indonesian has evolved through trade with China since ancient times, including through significant numbers of Chinese immigrants migrating to Indonesia. As a result, some of the Chinese language, especially the Hokkien dialect, has been incorporated into Indonesian.
 Muslim influence, originally through Arabic and Persian traders over a number of centuries, resulted in an extensive influence from the Arabic and Persian.
 Portuguese contact, trade and colonization in the 16th century was the first contact between Indonesia and European culture, and had an influence that remains today, in spite of the relatively short time period of that influence.
 Dutch colonization and administration, lasting from the 17th century to the 20th, extensively affected the vocabulary. As Dutch-trained linguists determined the rules for the official Indonesian language, Dutch thus affected the structure of the language as well. For example, suffixes such as "-asi" (e.g., administrasi = administrative) and "-if" (e.g., fiktif = fictief) were applied with consistency. Some loan words are still intensively used today, although Indonesian equivalents exist.
 Modern Indonesian regularly adopts new words from other languages, particularly English. In contrast to the large number of mechanical terms borrowed from Dutch (e.g., automotive parts), hi-tech words are typically taken from English (e.g., internet) and some informal greetings such as hai, he (probably from Javanesse), yo, etc.

But the processes may also be ‘out of period’; for example, Indonesian words are still being concocted from Sanskrit, and the influence of the Dutch language certainly continued after the Dutch themselves left.

Indonesian has also generalized brand names into common (lower-case) nouns as generic name. For example, "sanyo" refers to any electrical well pump, regardless of manufacturer, "odol" as all of toothpastes, or “aqua” for mineral water. This is similar to the type of generalization that occurs in English words like "xerox" or "tampax" or "polaroid".

List of loanwords

From Austronesian languages

From Minangkabau
Most of Indonesian's vocabulary is natively derived from Malay, but some might ultimately be loanwords from the Minang language. Yet it is unclear, since Malay and Minang are closely related, and some might consider Minang to have been an ancestral dialect of Malay.

From Javanese
Compared to the Malay language spoken as the native regional language in Sumatra and the Malay peninsula or the standardized version of Malaysian, Indonesian differs profoundly by the large amount of Javanese loanwords incorporated into their already rich vocabulary. This is mostly contributed by Java's position as the center of Indonesian politics, education, and culture, since the capital is located in Jakarta on Java island, albeit in the area where the Javanese are not the majority. The disproportionate number of Javanese that dominate Indonesian politics is reflected by the fact that six out of seven Indonesian presidents have been ethnic Javanese. The result is that the Javanese began to pour their own vocabulary into Indonesian to describes terms and words that do not have exact counterparts in the Malay language. It is also important to note that most of Indonesian's Sanskrit loanwords have been transmitted through Old Javanese, a language whose Sanskrit borrowings number almost 50% of the total vocabulary. Javanese loanwords, unlike those from other native languages, have entered the basic vocabulary of Indonesian to such an extent that, for many, they are no longer perceived to be foreign.

From Sundanese
Besides Javanese, Sundanese is another local language that has influenced Indonesian's vocabulary, albeit to a lesser extent. This can be attributed to the fact that the capital, Jakarta, was formerly a part of West Java, a province which, together with Banten, before it too was divided, constituted the Pasundan (Sundanese world), the most significant non-Javanese region in an otherwise Javanese-dominated Java island. Some of the most populous cities in Indonesia are also located in the Pasundan, including West Java's capital, Bandung, and Jakarta's four satellite cities (Bekasi, Bogor, Depok, and Tangerang).

From Betawi
Betawi is a Malay-based creole that arose from influences by foreign traders who stopped at the capital, Jakarta, including those from China and Arabia. Most of its speakers are inhabitants of Jakarta, and its influence upon Indonesian is attributed to its frequent usage in Indonesian mass media, including radio and television. Its status as a "hip" language by other portions of Indonesian society is another contributing factor as well.

From Nias

From Batak

From Balinese
Balinese, or simply Bali, is a Malayo-Polynesian language spoken by 3.3 million people (as of 2000) on the Indonesian island of Bali as well as northern Nusa Penida, western Lombok and eastern Java.

From Indian languages

From Sanskrit

Although Hinduism and Buddhism are no longer the major religions of Indonesia, Sanskrit, the language vehicle for these religions, is still held in high esteem, and its status is comparable with that of Latin in English and other Western Indo-European languages. Sanskrit is also the main source for neologisms; these are usually formed from Sanskrit roots. For example, the name of Jayapura city (former Hollandia) and Jayawijaya Mountains (former Orange Range) in the Indonesian province of Papua were coined in the 1960s; both are Sanskrit origin name to replace its Dutch colonial names. Some Indonesian contemporary medals of honor and awards, such as Bintang Mahaputra medal, Kalpataru award and Adipura award, are also Sanskrit derived names.

The loanwords from Sanskrit cover many aspects of religion, art and everyday life. The Sanskrit influence came from contacts with India long ago before the 1st century. The words are either directly borrowed from India or through the intermediary of the Old Javanese language. In the classical language of Java, Old Javanese, the number of Sanskrit loanwords is far greater. The Old Javanese — English dictionary by Prof. P.J. Zoetmulder, S.J. (1982) contains no fewer than 25,500 entries. Almost half are Sanskrit loanwords. Sanskrit loanwords, unlike those from other languages, have entered the basic vocabulary of Indonesian to such an extent that, for many, they are no longer perceived to be foreign.

From Pali
Pali (Pāli) is a Prakrit language and belongs to the Indo-European language family together with Sanskrit. As Sanskrit is the language vehicle of Hinduism, Pali is the language vehicle for Buddhism, especially the Theravada tradition which is mainly adhered to by Buddhists within Indosphere Southeast Asia. Virtually every word in Pāḷi has cognates in the other Middle Indo-Aryan languages, the Prakrits. The relationship to Vedic Sanskrit is less direct and more complicated; the Prakrits were descended from Old Indo-Aryan vernaculars.

From Hindi
Hindi (Devanagari: हिन्दी, IAST: Hindī) is a standardised and Sanskritised register of the Hindustani language. Hindi is an Indo-European, and specifically an Indo-Aryan language. It is descended from Sanskrit and is considered part of the Central Indo-Aryan subgroup.

From Tamil
Loanwords from Tamil, while also an Indian language (though not Indo-European like Sanskrit), mainly exist in cuisine, like Chinese and unlike Sanskrit. It is a Dravidian language and not an Indo-Aryan language. However, Hinduism had great impact in Tamil, there are several Indo-Aryan loanwords in Tamil and they are possibility to list them in Indo-Aryan loanwords, such as Sanskrit.

Interaction between Tamil speakers and Malay speakers has been established from ancient time. Tamil influence has been around such as Palava usage as ancient script in Indonesia (Palava dynasty was existed on 275 CE–897 CE) and Chola invasion of Srivijaya in 1025. It mainly entered the lexicon of Malay (and by extension, Indonesian) with the immigration of South Indian traders who settled around the Strait of Malacca.

From Middle Eastern languages

From Arabic
The loanwords from Arabic are mainly concerned with religion, in particular with Islam. Allah is the word for God even in Christian Bible translations.  Many early Bible translators, when they came across some unusual Hebrew words or proper names, used the Arabic cognates. In the newer translations, this practice has been discontinued. They now turn to Greek names or use the original Hebrew word. For example, the name Jesus was initially translated as 'Isa, but is now spelt as Yesus.

From Persian

Persian is an Indo-European language under the Indo-Iranian branch, wherein Sanskrit and Hindi belongs.

From Hebrew

From East Asian languages

From Chinese

Chinese loanwords into Indonesian often involve cuisine, trade, or Chinese culture. According to the 2000 census, the relative number of people of Chinese descent in Indonesia (termed the peranakan) is almost 1% (totaling to about 3 million people, although this may likely be an underestimate due to an anti-Chinese sentiment that exists in some circles of the population), yet the peranakan are the most successful when it comes to business, trade, and cuisine. Words of Chinese origin (presented here with accompanying Hokkien/ Mandarin pronunciation derivatives as well as traditional and simplified characters) include pisau (匕首 bǐshǒu  – knife), mie (T:麵, S:面, Hokkien mī – noodles), lumpia (潤餅 (Hokkien = lūn-piáⁿ) – springroll), teko (T:茶壺, S:茶壶 = cháhú [Mandarin], teh-ko [Hokkien] = teapot), 苦力 kuli = 苦　khu (bitter) and 力　li (energy) and even the widely used slang terms gua and lu (from the Hokkien 'goa' 我 and 'lu/li' 你 – meaning 'I/ me' and 'you'). Almost all loanwords in Indonesian of Chinese origin come from Hokkien (福建) or Hakka (客家).

From Japanese

Japanese is an East Asian language spoken by about 126 million people, primarily in Japan, where it is the official language and national language. The influx of Japanese loanword can be classified into two periods, Japanese colonial administration period (1942–1945) and globalisation of Japanese popular culture (1980-now). As Indonesian is written using Latin script, Japanese romanisation systems influence the spelling in Indonesian.

From Korean
In contrast with Chinese and Japanese, Korean loanwords are mostly related to Korean culture. These loanword is attributed to increasing popularity of South Korean culture. Since the turn of the 21st century, South Korea has emerged as a major exporter of popular culture and tourism, aspects which have become a significant part of its burgeoning economy. This phenomenon is called Korean Wave.

From European languages
The European influence on Indonesian is largely related to European intervention and colonialism. The most significant consequence is the continued use of the Latin alphabet instead of various local scripts. 

The Portuguese arrived first in the archipelago and influenced the original Malay language after their conquest of Malacca. Portuguese dominance over trade in the region and control of the spice islands of Moluccas significantly increased Portuguese influence, as did the introduction of Christianity in the region. 

However, Dutch has had the most influence on the language, as a result of the Dutch having controlled Indonesia for 300 years after eliminating Portuguese influence in the archipelago. The Dutch language itself was not introduced into the archipelago before 1799, when the Dutch government took over the colony from the already bankrupt VOC (Dutch East India company). Previously, the Malay language had adopted by the VOC due to its trade and diplomatic benefit, which led to large numbers of loanwords being introduced into the language. 

English has also exerted a certain influence on the archipelago's language, being the third most favored foreign language by the educated in colonial days. More recently, English has played an increasingly large role in the nation's official language as a result of globalization.

From Portuguese
Alongside Malay, Portuguese was the lingua franca for trade throughout the archipelago from the sixteenth century through to the early nineteenth century. The Portuguese were among the first westerners to sail east to the "Spice Islands". Loanwords from Portuguese were mainly connected with articles the early European traders and explorers brought to Southeast Asia.

From Dutch

The former colonial power, the Netherlands, left an extensive imprint on Indonesian vocabulary. These Dutch loanwords, as well as other non Italo-Iberian European language loanwords which were introduced via Dutch, cover all aspects of life. Some Dutch loanwords possessing clusters of multiple consonants pose difficulties for speakers of Indonesian. This problem is usually solved by the insertion of the schwa. For example, Dutch schroef  → sekrup . The months from January (Januari) to December (Desember) used in Indonesian are also derived from Dutch. Although Dutch loanwords are normally no longer newly-developed, there is some sort of derivation using Dutch-loaned suffixes, like -si "-tion" ← Dutch -tie, -ase "-age" ← -age, and -is "-ic, -ish" ← -isch.

It is estimated that 10,000 words in the Indonesian language can be traced back to the Dutch language.

From Greek

From Latin
It is notable that some of the loanwords that exist in both Indonesian and Malaysian languages are different in spelling and pronunciation mainly due to how they derived their origins: Malaysian utilizes words that reflect the English usage (as used by its former colonial power, the British), while Indonesian uses a Latinate form reflected in the Dutch usage (e.g. aktiviti (Malaysian) vs. aktivitas (Indonesian), universiti (Malaysian) vs. universitas (Indonesian)).

From French

From English
Many English words are adopted in Indonesian through globalization, due to this however many Indonesians mistake words that were originally adopted from Dutch with English due to the Germanic traces that exist in the two languages (both are Indo-European Germanic languages from the same branch, the West Germanic).
However, many English words in Indonesian too are borrowed via Malay, (such as: sains (science), enjin (engine), botol (bottle), gaun (gown), etc.).

From North Germanic
The North Germanic languages make up one of the three branches of the Germanic languages, a sub-family of the Indo-European languages, along with the West Germanic languages and the extinct East Germanic languages. The language group is sometimes referred to as the "Nordic languages", a direct translation of the most common term used among Danish, Swedish, Icelandic and Norwegian scholars and laypeople.

From Russian

From Italian

See also
 List of English words of Indonesian origin
 List of loanwords in Malay
 Loan words in Sri Lankan Tamil
 Indonesian history
 Differences between Malay and Indonesian

References

Bibliography 

 de Vries, Jan W., Grĳns, C.D. and Santa Maria, L. 1983 Indonesian : a check-list of words of European origin in Bahasa Indonesia and traditional Malay Leiden : Koninklĳk Instituut voor Taal-, Land- en Volkenkunde. .
 Badudu, J.S; Kamus Kata-kata Serapan Asing Dalam Bahasa Indonesia; Kompas, Jakarta, 2003
 Kamus Besar Bahasa Indonesia, Departemen Pendidikan dan Kebudayaan, Jakarta, Balai Pustaka: 1999, halaman 1185 s.d. 1188 berisikan Pendahuluan buku Senarai Kata Serapan dalam Bahasa Indonesia, Departemen Pendidikan dan Kebudayaan, Jakarta, 1996 (dengan sedikit penyaduran tanpa mengubah maksud dan tujuan seseungguhnya dari buku ini).

External links 
 Indonesian Etymology Database
 SEAlang Library Orthography search engine on Loan-Words in Indonesian and Malay

 
Loanwords
Indonesian
Indonesian
 
Indonesian